Acronychia baeuerlenii, commonly known as Byron Bay acronychia, is a species of rainforest shrub or small tree endemic to eastern Australia. It has simple, glabrous leaves, small groups of flowers and fleshy oval fruit.

Description 
Flowering occurs between October and February and the fruit is a fleshy, creamy to light green, oval, four-celled drupe  in diameter with eight ribs.

Taxonomy
Acronychia baeuerlenii was first formally described in 1974 by Thomas Gordon Hartley in the Journal of the Arnold Arboretum from specimens collected near Burringba in 1898.

Distribution and habitat
Byron Bay acronychia is found between the Richmond River, New South Wales in New South Wales to Lamington National Park just over the border in Queensland.

Conservation status
Byron Bay acronychia is classified as of "least concern" under the Queensland Government Nature Conservation Act 1992.

Essential oils
The leaves of this species contain a number of essential oils.

References

baeuerlenii
Flora of New South Wales
Flora of Queensland
Plants described in 1974
Taxa named by Thomas Gordon Hartley